The 1st Marine Aircraft Wing is an aviation unit of the United States Marine Corps that serves as the Aviation Combat Element of the III Marine Expeditionary Force.  The wing is headquartered at Camp Foster on the island of Okinawa, Japan.  Activated in 1940, the wing has seen heavy combat operations during World War II, the Korean War and the Vietnam War.

Mission

Conduct air operations in support of the Fleet Marine Forces to include offensive air support, antiair warfare, assault support, aerial reconnaissance including active and passive electronic countermeasures (ECM), and control of aircraft and missiles. As a collateral function, the Wing may participate as an integral component of Naval Aviation in the execution of such other Navy functions as the Fleet Commander may direct.

Subordinate units

1st MAW consists of four subordinate groups, a headquarters squadron and a liaison unit:
 Marine Wing Headquarters Squadron 1 (MWHS-1)
 Marine Wing Liaison Kadena (MWLK)
 Marine Aircraft Group 12 (MAG-12)
 Marine Aircraft Group 24 (MAG-24)
 Marine Aircraft Group 36 (MAG-36)
 Marine Air Control Group 18 (MACG-18)

Locations
Units of 1st MAW are located in the Pacific Region at the following bases:
Marine Corps Air Station Futenma
Marine Corps Air Station Iwakuni
Marine Corps Air Facility Kaneohe Bay.

History

World War  II

In late 1940, Congress authorized a naval air fleet of fifteen thousand aircraft.  The Marine Corps was allotted a percentage of these planes to be formed into 2 air wings with 32 operational squadrons.  On the advice of Navy and Marine advisors returning from observing the war in Europe these numbers were doubled very soon after.  It was under this expansion program that the 1st Marine Aircraft Wing was activated at Marine Corps Base Quantico, Virginia, on July 7, 1941.  The First Marine Aircraft Group which was the largest east coast aviation unit in the Marines at the time, became its first component.  Although a new wing, it is considered an unofficial descendant of the Northern Bombing Group of World War I.

Following the attacks on Pearl Harbor, the wing transferred to Naval Air Station San Diego, California, on December 10, 1941, and then to Camp Kearny on December 31.  The first deployment for 1st MAW came in August 1942 when forward elements of the Wing arrived on Guadalcanal and made up the Cactus Air Force  supporting the 1st Marine Division during the Battle of Guadalcanal.

Korean War

At the beginning of the Korean War, the initial deployment of Marines was a provisional brigade activated on July 7, 1950 — the 1st Provisional Marine Brigade — formed from the 1st Marine Division and the 1st Marine Aircraft Wing. Its core consisted of two units — a regimental combat team from the 5th Marine Regiment and Marine Aircraft Group 33 (MAG-33).  Their job was to provide close air support, resupply, and Medevac for Marine ground forces.

In late-June 1952, 75 aircraft from 1st MAW participated in the attack on the Sui-ho Dam which were strikes aimed at the hydroelectric plants in North Korea. The Wing's Chief of Staff Frank Schwable was shot down in July 1952 and while a prisoner of war confessed to having participated in germ warfare. He was eventually cleared of all charges, but his case prompted a review of training and expectations of prisoners-of-war.

Two 1st MAW aircraft groups, MAG-33 and MAG-12, and the 1st Antiaircraft Artillery Gun Battalion served during the course of the war.  The wing flew 127,496 sorties of which over 40,000 were close air support and Marine helicopters evacuated more than 9,800 wounded personnel

Taiwan

From 6 March – 30 April 1963. The VMF-114, VMA-542 and VMF-235 of the 1st Marine Aircraft Wing from Okinawa deployed to Pingtung Air Base, Taiwan and with ROC Air Force participated in “BLUE EAGLE“ exercise.  While on Taiwan these units were under the control of United States Taiwan Defense Command.

Vietnam

From April 1962, when HMM-362 flew into the Mekong Delta to set up operations at the Sóc Trăng Airfield, through April 1975, when helicopters of HMM-164 evacuated the last Americans from the US Embassy, Saigon. While early missions involved Marine helicopters providing logistical support for South Vietnam, this role quickly expanded when 1st MAW pilots and crewmen were called upon to perform their traditional role of providing close air support for Marine combat units as American involvement in the war escalated.

Helicopters played an extensive role in air operations in Vietnam, as Marine pilots flew CH-34s and later CH-46s and CH-53s to transport Marines into landing zones near suspected enemy concentrations, and to evacuate the wounded following combat engagements. Helicopters, supplemented by C-130 transports where there were landing strips, were also used to re-supply Marines in the field at remote outposts. Other Marine pilots flew UH-1E Hueys and AH-1 Cobras.  Many of these choppers provided reconnaissance and armed air cover for combat air operations.

The buildup of American troops resulted in the deployment of the Marine Corps' attack and fighter aircraft including the Douglas A-4 and the McDonnell F4B, as well as the maintenance, ordnance, and other support personnel necessary.

Global War on Terror

HMH 463 has deployed to support the Operation Enduring Freedom Mission in Afghanistan in 2009.

Current aircraft
Fixed-wing aircraft
 F/A-18D Hornet
 F-35B Lightning II
 KC-130J Super Hercules

Rotary-wing aircraft
 AH-1W SuperCobra
 AH-1Z Viper
 UH-1Y Venom
 CH-53E Super Stallion

Tiltrotor Aircraft
 MV-22B Osprey

UAVs
RQ-7 Shadow
Scan Eagle

Unit awards
A unit citation or commendation is an award bestowed upon an organization for the action cited. Members of the unit who participated in said actions are allowed to wear on their uniforms the awarded unit citation. The 1st Marine Aircraft Wing has been presented with the following awards:

See also

 List of United States Marine Corps aircraft wings
 United States Marine Corps Aviation
 List of 1st Marine Aircraft Wing Commanders

References

Bibliography

Print

{{cite book
 |title=U.S. Marine Corps World War II Order of Battle - Ground and Air Units in the Pacific War, 1939 - 1945. |author=Rottman, Gordon L.
 |year=2002
 |publisher=Greenwood Press
 |isbn=0-313-31906-5
}}

Web
 1MAW official history
 First Marine Aircraft Wing Association - Vietnam Service, association of 1st MAW veterans who served in Vietnam
 "United States Marine Forces", in Korean War Order of Battle'', Brown Mouse Publishing. URL accessed December 27, 2005.

External links

 1st MAW's official website

1
AW0001
Military units and formations of the United States Marine Corps in World War II
1941 establishments in Virginia